In enzymology, an anthocyanidin 3-O-glucosyltransferase is an enzyme that catalyzes the chemical reaction

UDP-D-glucose + an anthocyanidin  UDP + an anthocyanidin-3-O-beta-D-glucoside

Thus, the two substrates of this enzyme are UDP-D-glucose and anthocyanidin, whereas its two products are UDP and anthocyanidin-3-O-beta-D-glucoside.

This enzyme belongs to the family of glycosyltransferases, specifically the hexosyltransferases.  The systematic name of this enzyme class is UDP-D-glucose:anthocyanidin 3-O-beta-D-glucosyltransferase. Other names in common use include uridine diphosphoglucose-anthocyanidin 3-O-glucosyltransferase, UDP-glucose:anthocyanidin/flavonol 3-O-glucosyltransferase, UDP-glucose:cyanidin-3-O-glucosyltransferase, UDP-glucose:anthocyanidin 3-O-D-glucosyltransferase, and 3-GT.  This enzyme participates in flavonoid biosynthesis.

References

 
 
 

EC 2.4.1
Enzymes of unknown structure
Anthocyanins metabolism